Cristiano Rositoano Michelena (born 7 March 1971) is a former international freestyle swimmer from Brazil. He was born in Rio Grande do Sul. He participated in two consecutive Summer Olympics for his native country, starting in 1988. His best result was the sixth place in the Men's 4×100-metre freestyle Relay in Barcelona, Spain.

He was at the 1987 Pan American Games, in Indianapolis. He won silver in the 400-metre freestyle, and bronze in the 4×100-metre freestyle and 4×200-metre freestyle. He also finished 4th in the 1500-metre freestyle, and 6th in the 200-metre freestyle.

At the 1988 Summer Olympics, in Seoul, he finished 10th in the 4×200-metre freestyle, 12th in the 4×100-metre freestyle, 23rd in the 200-metre freestyle, 23rd in the 400-metre freestyle, and 26th in the 1500-metre freestyle.

On 17 April 1989, he broke the short-course South American record in the 400-metre freestyle, with a time of 3:46.39. The record was broken only in the end of 2005, by Armando Negreiros.

At the 1992 Summer Olympics, in Barcelona, he finished 6th in the 4×100-metre freestyle, 7th in the 4×200-metre freestyle, and 21st in the 200-metre freestyle.

References

External links
 
 

1971 births
Living people
Swimmers at the 1987 Pan American Games
Swimmers at the 1988 Summer Olympics
Swimmers at the 1992 Summer Olympics
Olympic swimmers of Brazil
Place of birth missing (living people)
Pan American Games silver medalists for Brazil
Pan American Games bronze medalists for Brazil
Brazilian male freestyle swimmers
Pan American Games medalists in swimming
Medalists at the 1987 Pan American Games
21st-century Brazilian people
20th-century Brazilian people